Sergei Eremenko (born 6 January 1999) is a Finnish football player who plays for HIFK.

Club career
Eremenko made his professional debut in the Veikkausliiga for FF Jaro on 6 July 2014 in a game against Vaasan Palloseura.

On 5 February 2018, he transferred to FK Spartaks Jūrmala, who loaned him to FC Spartak Moscow until the end of 2018. On 31 December 2018, his loan term expired and he was removed by Spartak from their Premier League registration list without playing any games for the main squad.

On 25 January 2019, he joined Finnish club SJK Seinäjoki on loan.

On 2 February 2022, Eremenko signed a contract with HIFK for the 2022 season.

International
Eremenko holds a Finnish passport and represented Finland in juniors until March 2018, when the Football Association of Finland announced that Eremenko had informed them of his refusal to represent Finland internationally anymore in hopes of eventually representing Russia.

Personal
Eremenko's older brothers Roman Eremenko and Alexei Eremenko are Finnish international footballers, and his father Alexei Eremenko Sr. is a football manager and former footballer.

References

External links
 
 

1999 births
People from Jakobstad
Living people
Finnish footballers
Finland youth international footballers
Russian footballers
Finnish people of Russian descent
Veikkausliiga players
Latvian Higher League players
FF Jaro players
FC Spartak Moscow players
FC Spartak-2 Moscow players
FK Spartaks Jūrmala players
Seinäjoen Jalkapallokerho players
FC Orenburg players
AC Oulu players
HIFK Fotboll players
Association football midfielders
Finnish expatriate footballers
Russian expatriate footballers
Expatriate footballers in Latvia
Russian First League players
Russian Second League players
Sportspeople from Ostrobothnia (region)